Gigartinales is a red algae order in the class Florideophyceae.

Systematics

References 

 
Red algae orders